Lightning Peak may refer to:

 Lightning Peak (British Columbia)
 Lightning Peak (Bonner County, Idaho)
 Lightning Peak (Valley County, Idaho)
 Lightning Peak (Lincoln County, Montana)
 Lightning Peak (Mineral County, Montana)
 Lightning Peak in Mineral County, Montana
 Lightning Peak (Utah)
 Lightning Peak (Washington)